In mathematics, the Assouad–Nagata dimension (sometimes simply Nagata dimension) is a notion of dimension for metric spaces, introduced by Jun-iti Nagata in 1958 and reformulated by Patrice Assouad in 1982, who introduced the now-usual definition.

Definition

The Assouad–Nagata dimension of a metric space  is defined as the smallest integer  for which there exists a constant  such that for all  the space  has a -bounded covering with -multiplicity at most .

This definition can be rephrased to make it more similar to that of the Lebesgue covering dimension.

Relationship to other notions of dimension

Compare the similar definitions of Lebesgue covering dimension and asymptotic dimension.  A space has Lebesgue covering dimension at most  if it is at most -dimensional at microscopic scales, and asymptotic dimension at most  if it looks at most -dimensional upon zooming out as far as you need.  To have Assouad–Nagata dimension at most , a space has to look at most -dimensional at every possible scale, in a uniform way across scales.

The Nagata dimension of a metric space is always less than or equal to its Assouad dimension.

References

Metric geometry
Dimension theory